Lake Alcacocha (possibly from Quechua allqa black-and-white qucha lake) is a lake in Peru situated in the Pasco Region, Daniel Alcides Carrion Province, Tusi District, and in the Pasco Province, Simón Bolívar District. It is located 12 km from Cerro de Pasco.

See also
 Kuntuyuq
List of lakes in Peru

References

INEI, Compendio Estadistica 2007, page 26

Lakes of Peru
Lakes of Pasco Region